Dieudonné Ndomaté is former Minister of Arts, Culture and Tourism in the Central African Republic, and leader of Anti-balaka, arrested in 2021 for treason and later acquitted.

Life 
He is a paternal uncle of Rodrigue Ngaibona alias Andjilo, another Anti-balaka general. From 2004 to 2012 he studied at University of Bangui.

Civil war 
In 2013, Ndomaté joined Anti-balaka. On 5 December 2013, he left Bouca to participate in attack on Bangui. In December 2014, he was a Deputy Chief of Operations of the Anti-balaka of Boy-Rabe neighborhood in Bangui. In 2015, he was National Coordinator in charge of the operations of the former Antibalaka. After transfer of Patrice-Edouard Ngaïssona to the International Criminal Court in January 2019, Dieudonné Ndomaté became de facto leader of the Ngaïssona branch of the Anti-balaka. He was one of the signatories of 2019 peace agreement. On 3 March 2019, president Touadera nominated him as a Minister of Arts, Culture and Tourism.

On 28 March 2020, 16 anti-balaka members were arrested at his residence in police operation. In early April 2020, in a show of protest, he suspended his participation in the government for a few days. In 2020 elections, he was an independent candidate from district Batangafo I. On 15 December 2020, he joined Coalition of Patriots for Change led by former president François Bozizé. On 16 December, he left Bangui towards Batangafo taking with him a few vehicles which he handed over to CPC rebels. On 11 May 2021, he was arrested in Bouca for incitement to insurrection. On 12 May, he was transferred to Bangui and placed under arrest. On 27 May 2022, after two weeks of trials he and 15 other people were acquitted of all charges due to insufficient evidence.

External links

References 

Living people
People acquitted of treason
Tourism ministers of the Central African Republic
Leaders of Anti-balaka
People from Ouham
Year of birth missing (living people)